Amel Rustemoski (born 6 July 2000) is a footballer who plays as a forward for Swiss club Schaffhausen . Born in Switzerland, he is a youth international for North Macedonia.

Club career
On 13 July 2022, Rustemoski signed with Schaffhausen.

Career statistics

Club

Notes

References

External links
 Under-18 Profile at football.ch
 Under-19 Profile at football.ch

2000 births
Living people
People from Baden District, Aargau
Sportspeople from Aargau
Macedonian footballers
North Macedonia youth international footballers
North Macedonia under-21 international footballers
Swiss men's footballers
Switzerland youth international footballers
Swiss people of Macedonian descent
Association football forwards
Grasshopper Club Zürich players
SC Kriens players
FC Wil players
FC Schaffhausen players
Swiss Super League players
Swiss Challenge League players